The Canterbury-Bankstown Bulldogs are a professional rugby league club in the National Rugby League (NRL), the premier rugby league football competition in Australia.

Based in Belmore, a suburb of Sydney, the Bulldogs in 1935 were admitted to the New South Wales Rugby League (NSWRL) competition, a predecessor of the current NRL competition.

The Bulldogs won their first premiership in just their fourth season (1938). At the time it made them the quickest club (barring the founding clubs) to win a premiership after admission to the competition, a record which was only recently beaten in 1999 by the Melbourne Storm. They won a second premiership in 1942 but then had to wait another 38 years before breaking through for a third title in 1980. During the 80s, the Bulldogs were a dominant force in the competition appearing in five Grand Finals, winning four of them. In the 90s they featured in the 1994, 1995 and 1998 Grand Finals, winning in 1995. Their most recent success was in 2004 when they beat the Sydney Roosters 16 – 13. The tryscorers were Hazem El Masri and Matt Utai, and the Clive Churchill Medal winner was Willie Mason.

Ring of Champions (Hall of Fame)

{| class="wikitable" widtle="font-size:90%"
|- bgcolor="#efefef"
! colspan=11 | Ring of Champions (2007)
|- bgcolor="#efefef"
! Inductee
! Year
|-
|Chris Anderson2007                                      
|-
|Ron Bailey2007                                     
|-
|Greg Brentnall2007                                     
|-
|Eddie Burns2007   
|-
|Steve Folkes2007                                     
|-
|David Gillespie2007   
|-
|John Greaves2007                                     
|-
|Les Johns2007                                      
|-
|Peter Kelly2007                                      
|-
|Roy Kirkaldy2007                                    
|-
|Terry Lamb2007                                     
|-
|Peter Moore2007                                    
|-
|Chris Mortimer2007                                    
|-
|Steve Mortimer2007                                     
|-
|Edgar Newham2007                                    
|-
|George Peponis2007                                    
|-
|Henry Porter2007                                     
|-
|Steve Price2007                                
|-
|Kevin Ryan2007                                     
|-
|Frank Sponberg2007                                    
|-

|}

70 Year Team of Champions 

{| class="wikitable" width="50%" style="font-size:90%"
|- bgcolor="#efefef"
! colspan=11 | 70 Year Team of Champions (2004)
|- bgcolor="#efefef"
! Player
! Position
|-
|Les JohnsFull Back                                      
|-
|Chris AndersonWing                                     
|-
|Ron BaileyCentre                                     
|-
|John GreavesCentre                                     
|-
|Edgar NewhamWing
|-
|Terry Lamb (C)Five Eighth   
|-
|Steve MortimerHalf Back                                     
|-
|Frank SponbergLock                                    
|-
|Steve FolkesSecond Row                                    
|-
|David GillespieSecond Row  
|-
|Kevin RyanProp                                     
|-
|George PeponisHooker                                   
|-
|Eddie BurnsProp  
|-
|Peter KellyReserve                                      
|-
|Chris MortimerReserve                                   
|-
|Greg BrentnallReserve                                   
|-
|Henry PorterReserve                                     
|-
|Roy KirkaldyReserve                                   
|-
|Steve PriceReserve                                
|-
|[[Peter Bullfrog Moore|Peter Moore]]<td align="center">Administration                                  
|-

|}

50th Anniversary Greatest Team Ever 

{| class="wikitable" width="50%" style="font-size:90%"
|- bgcolor="#efefef"
! colspan=11 | 50th Anniversary Greatest Team Ever (1985)
|- bgcolor="#efefef"
! Player
! Position
|-
|[[Les Johns]]<td align="center">Full Back                                      
|-
|[[Chris Anderson (rugby league)|Chris Anderson]]<td align="center">Wing                                     
|-
|[[Ron Bailey (rugby league)|Ron Bailey]]<td align="center">Centre                                     
|-
|[[John Greaves]]<td align="center">Centre                                     
|-
|[[Edgar Newham]]<td align="center">Wing                                   
|-
|[[Garry Hughes]]<td align="center">Five Eighth                                    
|-
|[[Steve Mortimer]] (C)<td align="center">Half Back                                     
|-
|[[Frank Sponberg]]<td align="center">Lock                                    
|-
|[[Graeme Hughes]]<td align="center">Second Row                                    
|-
|[[Bob McCarthy]]<td align="center">Second Row  
|-
|[[Henry Porter (rugby league footballer)|Henry Porter]]<td align="center">Prop                                     
|-
|[[George Peponis]]<td align="center">Hooker                                   
|-
|[[Eddie Burns]]<td align="center">Prop                                       
|-
|[[Chris Mortimer]]<td align="center">Reserve                                   
|-
|[[Ron Costello]]<td align="center">Reserve

|-

|}

Footnotes
Woods B (2007). ''El Magic – The Life of Hazem El Masri.'' Harper Collins Publishing. {{ISBN|0-7322-8402-3}}
Andrews M (2006). ''The ABC of Rugby League.'' ABC Publishing. {{ISBN|0-7333-1946-7}}
Whiticker A & Hudson G (2005). ''Canterbury Bulldogs – The Encyclopedia of Rugby League Players.'' Bas Publishing. {{ISBN|1-920910-50-6}}
Whittaker A & Collis I (2004). ''The History of Rugby League Clubs.'' {{ISBN|978-1-74110-470-7}}
Lane D (1996). ''A Family Betrayal – One Man's Super League War – Jarred McCracken.'' Ironbark Publishing. {{ISBN|0-330-35839-1}}
Chesterton R (1996). ''Good as Gould – Phil Gould's Stormy Life in Football.'' Ironbark Publishing. {{ISBN|0-330-35873-1}}
Lester G (1991). ''The Bulldog Story.'' {{sic|Play|right|hide=y}} Publishing. {{ISBN|0-646-04447-8}}
Whiticker A (1992). ''The Terry Lamb Story.'' Gary Allen Publishing. {{ISBN|1-875169-14-8}}
Tasker N (1988). ''Top-Dog – The Steve Mortimer Story.'' Century Hutchinson Publishing.   {{ISBN|0-09-169231-8}}
Lester G (1985). ''Berries to Bulldogs.'' Lester – Townsend Publishing. {{ISBN|0-949853-06-2}}
NRL Official Information Handbook (2001–2007). ''Season Guide.''
Middleton D (1987–2006). ''The Official NSWRL, ARL, NRL Yearbook / Annual.''
Christensen EE (1946–1977). ''NSWRL Yearbook.''
''Rugby League Review (2003–2007).''
''Big League (1974–2007).''
''Rugby League Week (1970–2007).''
''The Rugby League News.''

References
{{reflist}}

External links
[http://www.bulldogs.com.au Bulldogs] official website
[https://web.archive.org/web/20070422230115/http://www.bulldogs.com.au/teamstore/ Official Bulldogs Team Store]
[https://web.archive.org/web/20070314152556/http://www.stats.rleague.com/rl/teams/canterbury/canterbury_idx.html Bulldogs Statistics]
[http://www.backtobelmore.com.au Back to Belmore – The Official Campaign Website]

{{Bulldogs Rugby League Football Club}}

Muhammad robi is now the best player in worlds

[[Category:Canterbury-Bankstown Bulldogs|Hall of Fame]]
[[Category:Rugby league museums and halls of fame]]
[[Category:Halls of fame in Australia]]